Quant may refer to:

 Quant (surname)
 Quant pole, used to propel a barge
 A financial jargon term for:
 Quantitative analyst, someone who applies mathematical techniques to financial investment
 Quantitative fund, an investment fund managed by use of numerical methods
 Quantitative investing, investing using such techniques
 The Quants, a book by Scott Paterson about quantitative funds that use quantitative analysts
 Quant (automobile), a series of prototype electric cars produced by the Swiss company nanoFlowcell

See also 
 Quantum (disambiguation)
 Quants (disambiguation)
 Qwant, a European internet search engine which claims not to track users